Timea Bacsinszky was the defending champion, but chose to compete in Doha instead.

Sloane Stephens won the title, defeating Dominika Cibulková in the final, 6–4, 4–6, 7–6(7–5).

Seeds

Draw

Finals

Top half

Bottom half

Qualifying

Seeds

Qualifiers

Draw

First qualifier

Second qualifier

Third qualifier

Fourth qualifier

Fifth qualifier

Sixth qualifier

External links
 WTA tournament draws

2016 Abierto Mexicano Telcel